Kettle Stones Provincial Park is a provincial park designated by the Government of Manitoba, Canada, in 1997. The park is considered to a Class III protected area under the IUCN protected area management categories.

See also
List of protected areas of Manitoba

References

Provincial parks of Manitoba
Protected areas of Manitoba